Melvin J. Miller (May 19, 1919 – November 15, 1974) was an American politician and farmer.

Miller was born in Mott, Hettinger County, North Dakota. He served in the United States Army Air Corps during World War II. Miller lived in Randall, Morrison County, Minnesota with his wife and family and was a farmer. Miller served as the Randall Town Assessor. He also served on the Randall Town Board and on the Randall Board of Education. Miller was a Democrat. He served in the Minnesota House of Representatives from 1973 until his death in 1974. Miller died from a heart attack at the Hotel St. Paul in Saint Paul, Minnesota. Miller was in Saint Paul for a Minnesota legislative committee meeting. He was re-elected to the Minnesota Legislature at the time of his death.

References

1919 births
1974 deaths
People from Hettinger County, North Dakota
People from Morrison County, Minnesota
Military personnel from North Dakota
Farmers from Minnesota
School board members in Minnesota
Democratic Party members of the Minnesota House of Representatives